Magyar Kupa (English: Hungarian Cup) is the main domestic cup for Hungarian men's team handball clubs, which is organized and supervised by the Hungarian Handball Federation. The competition is held annually, starting in September and concluding in April. The teams play in a one-leg knockout system with a final four tournament in the end. The winner of the Hungarian cup get the right to participate in the next year's EHF Cup Winners' Cup, unless they secure a place in the EHF Champions League. If happens so, then the runners-up take the opportunity to represent Hungary in the forthcoming continental event for cup winners.

Winners
In 1954, 1955 and 1957, the cup was held on a grand scale. In 1983 they played two series (in March and December). In 1967 and 1968 the finals were played only in the following year.
Previous cup winners are: 

 1951: Újpest
 1952: Bp. Honvéd
 1953: Vörös Meteor
 1954: Csepel
 1955: Vasas
 1956: Újpest
 1957: Csepel
 1958–62: Not Played
 1963: Ferencváros
 1964: Bp. Honvéd
 1965: Bp. Spartacus
 1966: Bp. Spartacus
 1967: Bp. Honvéd
 1968: Bp. Honvéd
 1969: Tatabánya
 1970: Bp. Spartacus
 1971: Bp. Honvéd
 1972: Bp. Honvéd
 1973: Győri ETO
 1974: Vasas
 1975: Not Played
 1976: Elektromos
 1977: Szeged
 1978: Tatabánya
 1979: Debreceni Dózsa
 1980: Elektromos
 1981: Elektromos
 1982: Szeged
 1983 : Szeged
 1983 : Bp. Honvéd
 1984: Veszprém
 1985: Győri ETO
 1986: Győri ETO
 1987: Győri ETO
 1988: Veszprém
 1988/89: Veszprém
 1989/90: Veszprém
 1990/91: Veszprém
 1991/92: Veszprém
 1992/93: Szeged
 1993/94: Veszprém
 1994/95: Veszprém
 1995/96: Veszprém
 1996/97: Elektromos
 1997/98: Veszprém
 1998/99: Veszprém
 1999/00: Veszprém
 2000/01: Dunaferr
 2001/02: Veszprém
 2002/03: Veszprém
 2003/04: Veszprém
 2004/05: Veszprém
 2005/06: Szeged
 2007/07: Veszprém
 2007/08: Szeged
 2008/09: Veszprém
 2009/10: Veszprém
 2010/11: Veszprém
 2011/12: Veszprém
 2012/13: Veszprém
 2013/14: Veszprém
 2014/15: Veszprém
 2015/16: Veszprém
 2016/17: Veszprém
 2017/18: Veszprém
 2018/19: Szeged
 2020/21: Veszprém
 2021/22: Veszprém

Finals
The following table contains all the finals from the sixty years long history of the Magyar Kupa. In some occasions, there was not held a final match but a final tournament. In these cases, the team with the most total points have been crowned as cup winners.

Performances

By club
The performance of various clubs is shown in the following table:

Notes

By county

 The bolded teams are currently playing in the 2018-19 season of the Hungarian League.

Sponsorship

See also
 Nemzeti Bajnokság I 
 Hungarian handball clubs in European competitions

References

External links
 Hungarian Handball Federation official website
 IT help for Hungarian handball competitions

Magyar Kupa Men
Handball competitions in Europe
Magyar Kupa